Agyare Koi Larbi (born 26 December 1949) was a Ghanaian politician and a member of the 2nd and 3rd parliament of the 4th republic of Ghana. He was a former member of Parliament for the then-Akropong constituency now known as the Akuapem North Constituency of the eastern region of Ghana. Larbi was also a former member of the parliamentary committee on education. He died in Accra on 10 November 2008.

Political career 
Larbi was one of the founders of the New Patriotic Party. He served two terms in Parliament as a representative of the then-Akropong Constituency which is now the Akuapem North constituency on the ticket of the New Patriotic Party from 1997 to 2004. His term in Parliament began when he contested in the 1996 general elections and won with a total of 14,590 of the total votes cast that year.

He contested again in the 2000 Ghanaian general elections and maintained his seat as a member of parliament for Akropong constituency of the third parliament of the fourth republic of Ghana with a total number of 8,659 votes representing 31.1% of the total votes cast over his opponents Anthony Gyampo of the National Democratic Congress who also polled 8,625 votes representing 31.0%, Albert Gyang Boohene who polled 5,113 votes representing 18.4% of the total votes cast, Nana Esi Howe Botsio polling 4,394 total votes cast which represent 15.8%, Sakyi Boafo Akuffo Convention People's Party who polled 914 votes representing 03.3% of the total votes cast and Kofi Koranteng People's National Convention also polling 136 votes representing 00.5% of the total votes cast. He did not contest in other elections after his term in office ended.

Personal life 
Larbi was a Christian and was married with three children.

Death 
He died at the Korle-Bu Teaching Hospital in 2008 after a sudden illness.

References 

New Patriotic Party politicians
People from Eastern Region (Ghana)
Ghanaian Christians
Government ministers of Ghana
Ghanaian MPs 1997–2001
Ghanaian MPs 2001–2005
1949 births
2008 deaths
21st-century Ghanaian politicians